Robert J. Schmitz (April 23, 1921 – October 10, 1999) was an American farmer, businessman, and politician.

Schmitz was born in St. Lawrence Township, Scott County, Minnesota. Schmitz lived on a farmer near Jordan, Minnesota with his wife and family. He was a farmer and the owner of the Schmitz Farmer Equipment Company. Schmitz served on the Scott County Soil and Conservation District Board. He served in the Minnesota Senate from 1975 to 1990 and was a Democrat. He died from Alzheimer's disease at the Valley View Nursing Home in Jordan, Minnesota.

Notes

1921 births
1999 deaths
People from Scott County, Minnesota
Businesspeople from Minnesota
Farmers from Minnesota
Democratic Party Minnesota state senators
Neurological disease deaths in Minnesota
Deaths from Alzheimer's disease